José Manuel Martins Teixeira Gomes (born 28 August 1970) is a Portuguese professional football manager, currently in charge of C.S. Marítimo.

He managed União Leiria, Rio Ave and Marítimo in the Primeira Liga, while also working in Hungary, Saudi Arabia, the United Arab Emirates, England and Spain.

Football career

Early career
Born in Matosinhos, Gomes started coaching in his early 20s, beginning with the youth teams of Clube Futebol de Valadares. He also worked as an assistant at F.C. Paços de Ferreira and S.C. Covilhã.

From 1998 to 2003, Gomes worked as a fitness coach with Gil Vicente FC, Paços and S.L. Benfica. He started 2003–04 as manager of Paços in the Primeira Liga, and was fired after seven losses in the first eight games; the club's season eventually ended in relegation.

Gomes spent most of the following years in the second division. In 2005–06 he had his second spell in Portugal's top division, drawing two matches and losing five at U.D. Leiria.

In late May 2008, Gomes was hired by FC Porto as part of Jesualdo Ferreira's staff. He spent four seasons as Ferreira's assistant at Porto, Málaga CF and Panathinaikos FC.

Videoton
On 21 January 2013, Videoton appointed Gomes as their new manager; he replaced his compatriot Paulo Sousa at the helm of the Hungarian side. He led the team to fourth place in Nemzeti Bajnokság I in his only full season, also losing the final of the Ligakupa to Diósgyőri VTK (1–2).

Arabia
Gomes then spent two seasons as head coach of Al Taawoun FC in the Saudi Professional League. On 30 May 2016 he joined Al-Ahli Saudi FC in the same league, signing a three-year deal after Christian Gross did not renew his contract. In early October, however, he was sacked and replaced by Gross.

Days later, Gomes succeeded Pablo Repetto at UAE Pro League's Baniyas Club who were struggling at the start of the campaign. He was fired on 28 January 2017 with the team still in last place, having taken four points from 12 games.

Gomes returned to Al Taawoun on 20 March 2017, following the dismissal of Constantin Gâlcă. He was succeeded by compatriot Pedro Emanuel on 7 May the following year.

Rio Ave
On 13 June 2018, Gomes returned to his country's top flight after over a decade away, signing for one season at Rio Ave FC. His debut on 26 July was a 1–0 defeat away to Jagiellonia Białystok in the second qualifying round of the UEFA Europa League, being eliminated after a 4–4 draw in the return game at the Estádio dos Arcos.

Reading
Gomes was appointed coach of EFL Championship club Reading on 22 December 2018, replacing caretaker Scott Marshall. With only two home defeats in the second half of the season, his side avoided relegation.

On 9 October 2019, after just two league wins from 11 matches in the new campaign, Gomes left.

Marítimo
On 14 November 2019, Gomes was named manager of C.S. Marítimo. In his only season in charge, he led the team to the 11th position in the Portuguese top tier.

Almería
On 27 July 2020, Gomes took over for fellow Portuguese Mário Silva at the helm of Spanish Segunda División side UD Almería, shortly before the promotion play-offs began. They were eliminated 3–1 on aggregate by Girona FC.

Gomes was dismissed by owner Turki Al-Sheikh on 27 April 2021 even though the team stood third in the table after achieving several away wins in a row during the season, in which he rarely fielded the same starting XI. He received a standing ovation from his players in the dressing room after delivering his farewell speech.

Return to Al Taawoun
On 22 August 2021, Gomes was appointed at Al Taawoun for the third time, taking over from the fired Nestor El Maestro. He left the club by mutual consent on 20 March 2022.

Ponferradina and Marítimo return
Gomes returned to Spain and its second tier on 13 June 2022, after being named manager of SD Ponferradina. He resigned on 19 November.

On 14 December 2022, Gomes went back to Marítimo, signing for the second-from-bottom team as their third manager of the season after Vasco Seabra and João Henriques.

Managerial statistics

Honours
Al Ahli
Saudi Super Cup: 2016

References

External links
Videoton official profile

1970 births
Living people
Sportspeople from Matosinhos
Portuguese football managers
Primeira Liga managers
Liga Portugal 2 managers
F.C. Paços de Ferreira managers
C.D. Aves managers
Leixões S.C. managers
U.D. Leiria managers
Moreirense F.C. managers
Rio Ave F.C. managers
C.S. Marítimo managers
Nemzeti Bajnokság I managers
Fehérvár FC managers
Saudi Professional League managers
Al-Taawoun FC managers
Al-Ahli Saudi FC managers
UAE Pro League managers
Baniyas SC managers
English Football League managers
Reading F.C. managers
Segunda División managers
UD Almería managers
SD Ponferradina managers
Portuguese expatriate football managers
Expatriate football managers in Hungary
Expatriate football managers in Saudi Arabia
Expatriate football managers in the United Arab Emirates
Expatriate football managers in England
Expatriate football managers in Spain
Portuguese expatriate sportspeople in Greece
Portuguese expatriate sportspeople in Hungary
Portuguese expatriate sportspeople in Saudi Arabia
Portuguese expatriate sportspeople in the United Arab Emirates
Portuguese expatriate sportspeople in England
Portuguese expatriate sportspeople in Spain